The HTC Gratia is a smartphone manufactured by HTC Corporation that runs the Android operating system with HTC Sense.

Release
The Gratia was released on October 18, 2010.  It appears to be a European version of the HTC Aria.
Compared to HTC Aria, Gratia runs the more recent Android 2.2 rather than 2.1, which offers speed improvements running apps, and a mobile Wi-Fi hotspot feature for hopping online with the laptop wherever the phone has a 3G signal. However, the 600 MHz processor inside the HTC Gratia doesn't support Adobe Flash streaming video.

See also
 Galaxy Nexus
 List of HTC phones
 Comparison of smartphones

References

Gratia
Android (operating system) devices
Discontinued smartphones